On 4 September 2006, Australian zookeeper, conservationist, and television programmer Steve Irwin was killed by a stingray while filming in the Great Barrier Reef. The stingray's barb pierced his chest, penetrating his thoracic wall and heart, causing massive trauma. He was at Batt Reef, near Port Douglas, Queensland, taking part in the production of the documentary Ocean's Deadliest. During a lull in filming caused by inclement weather, Irwin decided to snorkel in shallow waters while being filmed in an effort to provide footage for his daughter Bindi's television program.

Irwin's death is the only fatality from a stingray captured on video, although it has not been released to the public, and is one of the few human deaths from stingrays. Production was completed on Ocean's Deadliest, which was broadcast in the United States on the Discovery Channel four months after Irwin's death. The documentary was completed with footage shot in the weeks following the accident, but without including any mention of Irwin's death, aside from a tribute to Irwin at the end.

Circumstances

While swimming in chest-deep water, Steve Irwin approached a short-tail stingray, with an approximate span of two meters (6.5 ft), from the rear, in order to film it swimming away. He initially believed he had only a punctured lung; however, the stingray's barb pierced his heart, causing him to bleed to death. Crew members aboard Irwin's boat administered CPR and rushed him to the nearby Low Isles, where medical staff pronounced him dead.

Irwin's widow, Terri, stated in an interview with Access Hollywood aired on 11 January 2014 that the documentary contains no footage that was shot the day he died, and that the footage of his injury and death had been destroyed. Justin Lyons, a cameraman for the documentary, has said that although footage of the incident does exist, he is against its release. Philippe Cousteau Jr. filmed the remainder of the documentary weeks after Irwin's death.

Reactions

News of Irwin's death prompted reactions around the world. Then–Australian Prime Minister John Howard expressed "shock and distress" at Irwin's death, saying that "Australia has lost a wonderful and colourful son". Queensland's then-Premier Peter Beattie remarked that Irwin would "be remembered as not just a great Queenslander, but a great Australian". The Australian federal parliament opened on 5 September 2006 with condolence speeches by both Howard and the Leader of the Opposition, Kim Beazley. Flags at the Sydney Harbour Bridge were lowered to half-mast in honour of Irwin.

In the days following Irwin's death, reactions dominated Australian online news sources, talk-back radio programs, and television networks. In the United States, where Irwin had appeared in over 200 Discovery Network television programs, special tributes appeared on the Animal Planet channel, as well as on CNN and major TV talk shows. Thousands of fans visited Australia Zoo after his death, paying their respects and bringing flowers, candles, stuffed animals and messages of support.

Funeral and memorial services

Family and friends of Irwin held a private funeral service in Caloundra on 9 September 2006. Irwin was buried in a private ceremony at Australia Zoo later that same day; the grave site is inaccessible to the zoo's visitors. Prime Minister Howard and Queensland Premier Beattie had offered to hold a state funeral, but Irwin's family declined the offer; his father said that he would have preferred to be remembered as an "ordinary bloke".

On 20 September, a public memorial service, introduced by Russell Crowe, was held in Australia Zoo's 5,500-seat Crocoseum; this service was broadcast live throughout Australia, the United States, the United Kingdom, Germany, and Asia, and it is estimated to have been seen by over 300 million viewers worldwide. The memorial included remarks by Prime Minister Howard; Irwin's father Bob and daughter Bindi; his associates Wes Mannion and John Stainton; and celebrities from Australia and around the world (including Hugh Jackman, Cameron Diaz, Justin Timberlake, Kevin Costner, Russell Crowe, David Wenham, Kelly Ripa and Larry King). Australian music star John Williamson sang "True Blue", which was Irwin's favourite song. In a symbolic finish to the service, Irwin's truck was loaded up with gear and driven out of the arena for the last time as Williamson sang. As a final tribute, Australia Zoo staff spelled out Irwin's catchphrase "Crikey" in yellow flowers as Irwin's truck was driven from the Crocoseum for the last time to end the service.

Stingray abuse
In the weeks following Irwin's death, at least ten stingrays were found dead and mutilated on the beaches of Queensland, with their tails cut off, prompting speculation as to whether they might have been killed by fans of Irwin as an act of revenge, although, according to the chairperson of the Queensland fishing information service, anglers regularly cut the tails off accidentally caught stingrays to avoid being stung.

Michael Hornby, a friend of Irwin and executive director of his Wildlife Warrior fund, condemned any revenge killings, saying that "We just want to make it very clear that we will not accept and not stand for anyone who's taken a form of retribution. That's the last thing Steve would want."

In an interview with Larry King, Bindi stated that she loves stingrays and does not feel bitterness towards them.

References

Irwin, Steve
Irwin, Steve
Irwin, Steve 
Irwin, Steve
Irwin, Steve
2006 in Australia
September 2006 events in Australia
Irwin, Steve
Great Barrier Reef
History of Queensland
Steve Irwin